Eupithecia myoma is a moth in the family Geometridae. It is found in Kyrghizstan.

The length of the forewings is 18–18.5 mm for males and 17–21 mm for females. The ground colour is dark fuscous with dark shady stripes.

References

Moths described in 1988
myoma
Moths of Asia